Pietro Ajosa (died 1492) was a Roman Catholic prelate who served as Bishop of Sessa Aurunca (1486–1492) and Bishop of Civita Castellana e Orte (1474–1486).

Biography
On 24 Jan 1474, he was appointed during the papacy of Pope Gregory XIII as Bishop of Civita Castellana e Orte. On 4 Aug 1486, he was appointed during the papacy of Pope Sixtus V as Bishop of Sessa Aurunca. He served as Bishop of Sessa Aurunca until his death in 1492. During his time as a bishop, he was the principal co-consecrator of Francesco de Noya, Bishop of Cefalù (1485).

See also 
Catholic Church in Italy

References

External links and additional sources
 (for Chronology of Bishops) 
 (for Chronology of Bishops) 

15th-century Italian Roman Catholic bishops
Bishops appointed by Pope Gregory XIII
Bishops appointed by Pope Sixtus V
1492 deaths